Unhappy may refer to:
an adjective denoting a person in a state of depression
Unhappy consciousness, a philosophical concept popularized by Georg Wilhelm Friedrich Hegel
Unhappy numbers, a mathematical concept
Unhappy triad, a knee injury
Unhappy Mac, a legacy Macintosh startup screen

People
"Unhappy Countess", an alternative name for Mary Bowes, Countess of Strathmore and Kinghorne

Media
"Unhappy Girl", a song by The Doors on their 1967 album Strange Days
"Unhappy Birthday", a song by Dead or Alive on their 1990 album Fan the Flame (Part 1)
"Unhappy", a song by Outkast on their 2003 album Speakerboxxx/The Love Below
Unhappy China, a 2009 book by Song Qiang, Huang Jisu, Song Xiaojun, Wang Xiaodong and Liu Yang
Unhappy, a manga by Cotoji adapted into an anime series